Hawke's Bay Town is located in Keamari Town in Karachi, Sindh, Pakistan. Hawke's Bay Town was notified in July 1984 by Karachi Development Authority. It is a residential Scheme for low / medium income group.

Hawke's Bay Town is also being developed as a neighbourhood to settle over 250,000 people displaced by the construction of Lyari Expressway. However the entire Hawke's Bay Housing Scheme No.42 is not for the settlement of displaced peoples of the construction of Lyari Expressway. Hawke's Bay Housing Scheme No.42 has been divided into 71 districts, generally known as blocks or sectors. A few of Sectors/Blocks (Sector 6, 9, and 10) has been allotted to displace people of Lyari Expressway, and other sectors/blocks have been allotted to citizens of Pakistan through public ballots, and a few sectors to journalists and government employees.

See also 
 Hawke's Bay Beach
 Lyari Development Authority
 Lyari Town
 Lyari Expressway Resettlement Project

References

External links 
 Hawksbay Scheme 42 Balloting Results 
 Sprawling township emerges in Hawkesbay: Lyari Expressway affected
 Lyari Development Authority Official website
 AlSamad Estates – Property Consultants Hawksbay Scheme 42 
 Handing Over Possession of Hawksbay Scheme 42 

Neighbourhoods of Karachi